Garrett may refer to:

Places in the United States
 Garrett, Illinois, a village
 Garrett, Indiana, a city
 Garrett, Floyd County, Kentucky, an unincorporated community
 Garrett, Meade County, Kentucky, an unincorporated community
 Garrett, Missouri, a ghost town
 Garrett, Pennsylvania, a borough
 Garrett, Texas, a town
 Garrett, Washington, a census-designated place
 Garrett, Wyoming, an unincorporated community
 Garrett County, Maryland

Businesses
 Garrett AiResearch, a former manufacturer of turbochargers and turbine engines, now part of Honeywell, Inc.
 Garrett Motion, manufacturer of turbochargers for ground vehicles
 Richard Garrett & Sons, a manufacturer of steam engines and agricultural machinery

Other uses
 Garrett (name), lists of people and fictional characters with the given name or surname
 Garrett-Evangelical Theological Seminary, a graduate school of theology affiliated with the United Methodist Church

See also
Garratt, a type of steam locomotive
Jarrett (surname)
Garet (disambiguation)